Saurenchelys finitima, also known as the Whitsunday wire eel is a species of eel in the family Nettastomatidae. It was described by Gilbert Percy Whitley in 1935, originally under the genus Chlopsis. It is a marine, tropical eel which is endemic to Australia, in the western Pacific Ocean.

References

Nettastomatidae
Fish described in 1935